Hilliard Christian School is an independent Seventh-day Adventist co-educational primary and secondary day school, located in the Hobart suburb of , Tasmania, Australia. The school caters for students from Year K to Year 10.

The school was established in 1901 in Hobart. In 1903 Hilliard was moved to a permanent site on Warwick Street that the school occupied until April 1926.

See also

 List of Seventh-day Adventist secondary schools
 Seventh-day Adventist education
 List of schools in Tasmania

References

External links

Hillard Christian School at Independent Schools Tasmania

Private primary schools in Hobart
Adventist secondary schools in Australia
Private secondary schools in Hobart
Educational institutions established in 1901
1901 establishments in Australia
Adventist primary schools in Australia